Matamoros is a city located in the southwestern part of the Mexican state of Coahuila; it serves as the seat of the surrounding municipality of the same name. It lies directly east of the larger city of Torreón and is a part of the Comarca Lagunera, a larger metropolitan area that includes the municipality of  Torreón in Coahuila in addition to the municipalities of Gómez Palacio and Lerdo in the adjacent state of Durango.

At the 2010 census the city had a population of 52,599 inhabitants, while the municipality had a population of 107,007. The municipality has an area of 1,003.7 km² (387.53 sq mi), which includes many small outlying communities, the largest of which is the town of San Antonio del Coyote.

References
Link to tables of population data from Census of 2005 INEGI: Instituto Nacional de Estadística, Geografía e Informática
Coahuila Enciclopedia de los Municipios de México

External links
Ayuntamiento de Matamoros Official website

Populated places in Coahuila